Elphinstone is a rural locality in the Toowoomba Region, Queensland, Australia. In the  Elphinstone had a population of 64 people.

History 
The locality's name was originally a railway station name, called after pioneer Darling Downs pastoralist Ernest George Beck Elphinstone Dalrymple related to Patrick Leslie of Canning Downs and Goomburra.

Elphinstone Provisional School opened on 28 May 1888. On 1 January 1909 it became Elphinstone State School. It closed temporarily in 1922, but soon re-opened. It closed permanently in 1963.

In the  Elphinstone had a population of 64 people.

References 

Toowoomba Region
Localities in Queensland